Rav Eliezer Yehuda Finkel (also called Leizer Yudel Finkel)  is a Haredi Jewish rosh yeshiva (dean) of the Mir Yeshiva in Jerusalem, which is considered to be the largest yeshiva in Israel with a student body of 6,000 students. He acceded to the position of rosh yeshiva after his father, Rabbi Nosson Tzvi Finkel, died suddenly on 8 November 2011.

Biography

Rav Finkel was named after his maternal great-grandfather, Rabbi Eliezer Yehuda Finkel, known as "Reb Leizer Yudel", who became rosh yeshiva of the Mir yeshiva in Poland in 1917 and re-established the yeshiva in Jerusalem during World War II whilst the main body of the Yeshiva was in exile in the Far East. His great-great-grandfather was the celebrated Mussar leader, the Alter of Slabodka.

References

Rosh yeshivas
Haredi rabbis in Israel
20th-century rabbis in Jerusalem
21st-century rabbis in Jerusalem
Living people
1965 births
Mir rosh yeshivas